Firasat  is a 2017 Pashto action and thriller film made by Atta Shah Hoti. The film stars Khursheed Khan, Parveen and Atta Shah Hoti in lead roles. It will release on 25 June 2017 in cinemas  under the production banner of ASK Media Production and ESK Studio.

Cast 
 Khursheed Khan
 Atta Shah Hoti
 Parveen
 Jehangir Adil
 Bi Bi Shireena
 Badar Munir
 Nasir Khan
 Arshad Khan
 Wahid Khan

See also
List of Pakistani films of 2017

References

External links 

2017 films
Pashto-language films
Films shot in Karachi
2017 action thriller films
Pakistani action thriller films
Lollywood films